is a Japanese anime series produced by Nippon Animation, and the first installment in the World Masterpiece Theater series in ten years after Remi, Nobody's Girl. It is an adaptation of Victor Hugo's classic 1862 novel Les Misérables, and the fourth anime adaptation of said novel (following two adaptations from the Japanese television program , and a 1979 TV special produced by Toei Animation).

It premiered across Japan on January 7, 2007, on Fuji TV's BS Fuji broadcast satellite network, and contains twenty-six episodes each season, for a total of fifty-two episodes. It also aired in Japan on Animax beginning in April 2007.

Plot
Set in nineteenth century-era France, the series begins with Cosette, a three-year-old girl, traveling with her mother Fantine, who is trying to find a job and a place to live, but have always been shunned away due to few employers hiring single mothers. When her mother is promised with the prosperity of working in the big city, Cosette is separated from her in the hopes a caretaker named Thénardier will watch over her while her mother earns some money. Unfortunately, this was a trick and the caretaker is a corrupt man who makes Cosette his indentured servant, or more precisely: his slave. Then, the kind mayor—formerly a convict named Jean Valjean—of the town that Cosette makes her new home in, sees how winds of change are so detrimental for children and families, and decides to do something about it, but forces Cosette to go on the run to escape his returning, difficult past.

Characters and cast

Episodes
Fantine and Cosette
Jean Valjean's Secret
A New Friend, Chou Chou
Mother's Letter
Javert's Suspicions
Cosette's Birthday
Lost Eponine
Mother's Skirt
Thenardier's Malice
Madeleine is Perplexed
Sister Simplice's Lie
Lonely Cosette
Jean Valjean and Cosette
Their Journey
Their Bond
The Gorbeau House in Paris
Javert Closes In
A Forgotten Reunion
Cosette is Taken
Monastic Life
Marius Pontmercy
Their Respective Journeys
Under The Parisian Sky
An Encounter in the Luxembourg Garden
Unreachable Feelings
Chance Encounters in Paris
The Girl Who Ran Away
The Found Letter
Thenardier's Trap
The Coin That Was Left Behind
The Quiet Rue Plumet
Traces of That Day
Giving Up On Reunion
Children In The Elephant
Patron Minette's Breakout
The Ailing of Paris
Marius's Miscalculation
Cosette and Eponine
June 5, 1832
The Night of the Revolution
Eponine's Love
A Letter from Marius
Gavroche's Wish
To the Light of the Future
The Sewers of Paris
Javert's Justice
The Bonds of the Hearts
Cosette and Marius
My Mother
The Eternal Ring
The Revealed Truth
The Silver Candlesticks

Staff
Original story: Les Misérables by Victor Hugo
Producer: Kōichi Motohashi
Planning: Kazuya Maeda (Fuji TV), Kōhei Sano, Kazuka Ishikawa
Production manager: Ken'ichirō Hayafune
Series composition: Tomoko Kanparu
Character designs: Hajime Watanabe, Takahiro Yoshimatsu
Chief animation director: Tadashi Shida
Background artist: Kazue Itō
Art director: Mitsuki Nakamura
Color design: Tomoko Komatsubara
Photography director: Seichi Morishita
Sound director: Hiroyuki Hayase
Music: Hayato Matsuo
Music producers: Hitoshi Yoshimura (Index Music), Daisuke Honji (Index Music)
Producers: Yukihiro Itō (Fuji TV), Kōji Yamamoto (Fuji TV), Michio Katō, Ken'ichi Satō
Director: Hiroaki Sakurai
Production: Fuji TV, Nippon Animation

Theme songs
Opening theme: 
Performance: Yuki Saitō (Index Music)
Ending theme: 
Performance: Yuki Saitō (Index Music)

Reception 
The anime was dubbed and broadcast in:

Arab World by Venus Centre
Italy under the title The Heart of Cosette
Hong Kong
Iran under the title Poor: A girl named Cosette
South Korea
Philippines under the title Ang Pangarap ni Cosette ("The Dreams of Cosette"); discontinued due to Typhoon Ondoy

See also
 Adaptations of Les Misérables

References

External links 
  
 BS Fuji's official Shōjo Cosette page 
 Animax's official Shōjo Cosette page 
 
 

Anime series
Drama anime and manga
Historical anime and manga
Works based on Les Misérables
World Masterpiece Theater series
Television series set in the 1810s
Television series set in the 1830s